Nanson is an unincorporated community in Rolette County, in the U.S. state of North Dakota.

History
Nanson was laid out in 1905. A post office was established at Nanson in 1905, and remained in operation until it was discontinued in 1982. The community was named for Fridtjof Nansen, a Norwegian scientist and explorer. By the 1960s, the town had withered to just a handful of residents, and by the 1990s, it was completely abandoned. Today, only a few abandoned homes and outbuildings remain.

References

Unincorporated communities in Rolette County, North Dakota
Populated places established in 1905
1905 establishments in North Dakota
Unincorporated communities in North Dakota